Waltham's Cross is a hamlet in the Braintree district of Essex. It is located approximately equidistant from the villages of Finchingfield, Great Bardfield and Wethersfield.

External links 
 Listed buildings in Walthams Cross

Hamlets in Essex
Great Bardfield